Body and Soul may refer to:

Entertainment

Songs
 "Body and Soul" (1930 song), a 1930 popular song and jazz standard, and the title song of many of the albums listed below
 "Body and Soul" (Anita Baker song), 1994
 "Body and Soul", an Australian top 5 single in 1982 by Jo Kennedy
 "Body and Soul", by Mai Tai
 "Body and Soul (That's the Way It's Got to Be)", a 1972 song by Soul Generation

Albums 
 Body and Soul (EP), a 1984 EP by The Sisters of Mercy, or the title song
 Body & Soul (Rick Astley album), or the title song, 1993
 Body and Soul (Cabaret Voltaire album), 1991
 Body and Soul (Al Cohn & Zoot Sims album), 1973
 Body and Soul (Dexter Gordon album), 1981
 Body and Soul (Coleman Hawkins album), 1994
 Body and Soul (Billie Holiday album), 1957
 The Body & the Soul, 1963 Freddie Hubbard album
 Body and Soul (Joe Jackson album), 1984
 Body and Soul (The Thad Jones / Mel Lewis Orchestra album), 1978
 Body & Soul (Tete Montoliu album), recorded 1971 released 1983
 Body and Soul (Jenny Morris album), or the title song, 1985
 Body and Soul (David Murray album), 1993
 Body and Soul (Ray Nance album), 1969
 Body and Soul (Archie Shepp album), 1975
 Body and Soul (Archie Shepp and Richard Davis album), 1991
 Body & Soul, a 1989 album by Jon Gibson

Films
 Body and Soul (1915 film), produced by the Frohman Amusement Corporation
 Body and Soul (1920 film), a silent film directed by Charles Swickard
 Body and Soul (1925 film), a silent race film by Oscar B. Micheaux
 Body and Soul (1927 film), a silent drama featuring Lionel Barrymore
 Body and Soul (1931 film), an aviation drama starring Charles Farrell and Humphrey Bogart
 Body and Soul (1947 film), a boxing-themed film noir starring John Garfield
 Body and Soul (1981 film), a remake of the 1947 film, starring Leon Isaac Kennedy and Jayne Kennedy
 Body and Soul (1999 film), another remake of the 1947 film, starring Ray Mancini
 Alien Nation: Body and Soul, a 1995 television film

Television
 "Body & Soul" (House), an episode of House
 "Body and Soul" (Star Trek: Voyager), an episode of Star Trek: Voyager
 Body & Soul (TV miniseries), a 1993 UK drama serial starring Kristin Scott Thomas
 Body & Soul (TV series), a 2002 American series starring Peter Strauss
 Body & Soul: Diana & Kathy, a film by Alice Elliott awarded Best in Festival at the 2008 Superfest International Disability Film Festival

Books
 Body and Soul, a 1993 novel by Frank Conroy
 Body+Soul, now known as Whole Living, a health and lifestyle magazine

Other
 Body & Soul, an American female hip-hop duo featuring Dee Barnes
 Soul and Body, two anonymous Old English poems

See also
 Bodies and Souls, a 1983 album by The Manhattan Transfer
 In Body and Soul, a 1951 Argentine film
 On Body and Soul, a 2017 Hungarian film
 With Body & Soul, a 1967 album by Julie London
 Body, Mind, Soul, a 1993 album by Debbie Gibson
 Mind Body & Soul, a 2004 album by Joss Stone
 "Mind, Body and Soul", a 1969 song by the Flaming Ember
 Cuerpo y Alma, a 2000 album by Soraya
 "Cuerpo y Alma" (song), 2000 song by Soraya
 Mit Leib und Seele (disambiguation)